The 2010 Barbados Premier Division (officially the Digicel Premiere League for sponsorship reasons) was the 64th season of the highest tier of football in Barbados. The season began on 15 February and concluded on 25 June. The league champions were Notre Dame SC.

Changes from 2010
 The league decreased in size from 11 teams down to 10
 Eden Stars, Technico and Maxwell were relegated to the Barbados First Division.
 Pinelands United and Ellerton were promoted to the Premier Division.

Table

Results

Positions by round

Statistics

Top Scorers

Related Competitions

CFU Club Championship

Footnotes

References

Barbados Premier Division seasons
Barb
Barb
football